The Ritter reaction is a chemical reaction that transforms a nitrile into an N-alkyl amide using various electrophilic alkylating reagents. The original reaction formed the alkylating agent using an alkene in the presence of a strong acid.

Mechanism and scope
The Ritter reaction proceeds by the electrophilic addition of either a carbenium ion or covalent species to the nitrile.  The resulting nitrilium ion is hydrolyzed to the desired amide.

Primary, secondary, tertiary, and benzylic alcohols, as well as  tert-butyl acetate, also  successfully react with nitriles in the presence of strong acids to form amides via the Ritter reaction.  A wide range of nitriles can be used. In particular, formonitrile (hydrogen cyanide) can be used to prepare formamides, which are useful precursors to isocyanides.

Applications
The large scale application of the Ritter reaction is in the synthesis of tert-octylamine.  An estimated 10,000 tons/y (year: 2000) of this and related lipophilic amines are prepared in this way. Otherwise, the Ritter reaction is most useful in the formation of amines and amides of pharmaceutical interest.  Real world applications include Merck's industrial-scale synthesis of anti-HIV drug Crixivan (indinavir); the production of the falcipain-2 inhibitor PK-11195; the synthesis of the alkaloid aristotelone; and synthesis of Amantadine, an antiviral and antiparkinsonian drug. Other applications of the Ritter reaction include synthesis of dopamine receptor ligands and licit and illicit production of racemic amphetamine from allylbenzene and methyl cyanide.

The Ritter reaction is inferior to most amination methods because it cogenerates substantial amounts of salts.  Illustrative is the conversion of isobutylene to tert-butylamine using HCN and sulfuric acid followed by base neutralization. The weight of the salt byproduct is greater than the weight of the amine.

In the laboratory, the Ritter reaction suffers from the necessity of an extremely strong acid catalyst.  Other methods have been proposed in order to promote carbocation formation, including photocatalytic electron transfer or direct photolysis.

History
The reaction is named after John J. Ritter, who supervised the Ph.D. thesis work of P. Paul Minieri.

References

Addition reactions
Name reactions
Amide synthesis reactions
Articles containing video clips